Michael Korda (born 8 October 1933) is an English-born writer and novelist who was editor-in-chief of Simon & Schuster in New York City.

Early years
Born in London, Michael Korda is the son of English actress Gertrude Musgrove and the Hungarian-Jewish artist and film production designer Vincent Korda. He is the nephew of film magnate Sir Alexander Korda and his brother Zoltan Korda, both of whom were film directors. Korda grew up in the UK but received part of his education in France where his father had worked with film director Marcel Pagnol. As a child, Korda also lived in the United States from 1941 to 1946. He was schooled at the private Institut Le Rosey in Switzerland and read History at Magdalen College, Oxford. He served in the Royal Air Force doing intelligence work in Germany.

The novelist Graham Greene was a lifelong friend. Korda met him on his uncle Alex Korda's yacht.

Career
Korda moved to New York City in 1957 where he worked for playwright Sidney Kingsley as a research assistant and then later as a freelance reader in the CBS story department. In 1958 he joined the book publishing firm Simon & Schuster, beginning as an assistant editor, which included the task of reading slush pile manuscripts for Henry Simon.

Many editors stick to one area of interest, but early on Korda demonstrated an ability and interest in editing both fiction and non-fiction. He states in his memoir that he edited books on everything from mathematics and philosophy, memoirs, fiction, translations from French, politics, anthropology and science history among others. One of the first books Korda bought was The Forest People by Colin Turnbull—a memoir of Turnbull's time living with the Mbuti Pygmies in the then Belgian Congo.

After Robert Gottlieb left Simon & Schuster for Alfred A. Knopf, Korda became Editor-in-Chief of Simon & Schuster. Korda was a major figure in the book industry, publishing numerous works by high-profile writers and personalities such as William L. Shirer, Will and Ariel Durant, Harold Robbins, Irving Wallace, Richard Nixon, Richard Rhodes and Ronald Reagan. Korda was a major part of Simon & Schuster for more than forty years. In the autumn of 1994, he was diagnosed as having prostate cancer. In 1997 he wrote Man to Man, which recounted his medical experience. In 2000, he published Another Life: A Memoir of Other People, about the world of publishing.

In addition to being an editor, Korda was also a writer. In the mid-sixties Korda began to write freelance articles for Glamour magazine and eventually wrote their film review column for almost ten years. Korda also wrote for Clay Felker's New York magazine including a piece that eventually became his first book, Male Chauvinism and How it Works at Home and in the Office. Korda's second book, Power!, reached the number one spot on The New York Times Bestseller list in 1975. Korda the writer was represented by agent Lynn Nesbit.

Among Korda's other books are Charmed Lives, which is the story of his father and his two uncles, and the novel Queenie, which is a roman à clef about his aunt, actress Merle Oberon, which was later adapted into a television miniseries. Korda said he felt that Charmed Lives was the book he was born to write, "as if I had been observing and storing up memories with just that purpose in mind for years."

Beginning in the 2000s, Korda wrote a number of history and biography books on the Hungarian Revolution, Dwight Eisenhower, T.E. Lawrence and Robert E. Lee. On writing histories Korda said, "I've always wanted to write history, and it was only the accident of going to work for a book publisher in 1958 (and the need to earn a regular paycheck) that slowed me down".

Michael Korda is Editor-in-Chief Emeritus of Simon & Schuster.

Private life
Michael Korda was married to Carolyn "Casey" Keese from 1958 until their divorce in 1978. They had one child together, Chris, a musician and founder of the Church of Euthanasia.

Later in 1978, Korda married Margaret Mogford, a former fashion model and the former wife of photographer Burt Glinn. The two shared a love of horses and met at the Claremont Riding Academy near Central Park while they were both still married to their spouses. He was Mogford's third husband. They co-authored a number of books together including Horse Housekeeping. Mogford died of brain cancer at age 79 in 2017, which Korda detailed in his 2019 memoir Passing.

Korda has written about his personal life and his hobbies. An avid horseman and fox hunter, he authored Horse People and Horse Housekeeping. In 2001, Korda released Country Matters, which chronicled his life at his second home, Stonegate Farm.

Bibliography

 Male Chauvinism and How It Works at Home and in the Office, Hodder and Stoughton, 1972 
 Power! How to Get It, How to Use It, Random House, New York, 1975, 
 Success!, Ballantine Books, New York, 1977, 
 Charmed Lives, Random House, 1979 
 Worldly Goods, Random House, 1982, 
 Queenie, Simon & Schuster, 1985, 
 The Fortune, Summit Books, 1989,  
 Curtain, Summit Books, 1991, 
 Man to Man: Surviving Prostate Cancer, Little, Brown & Company, 1997,  
 Another Life: A Memoir of Other People, Random House, 1999 
 Making the List: A Cultural History of the American Bestseller, 1900–1999, Barnes and Noble Books, 2001, 
 Country Matters: The Pleasures and Tribulations of Moving from a Big City to an Old Country Farmhouse, New York: Harper, 2001,  
 Ulysses S. Grant: The Unlikely Hero, New York: HarperCollins, 2004, 
 Marking Time: collecting watches and thinking about time, New York: Barnes & Noble, 2004, 
 Horse People: Scenes from the Riding Life, Harper Perennial, 2004, 
 Horse Housekeeping: Everything You Need to Know to Keep a Horse at Home (co-authored with Margaret Korda), 2005, 
 Journey to a Revolution: A Personal Memoir and History of the Hungarian Revolution of 1956, Harper Perennial, 2006, 
 Ike: An American Hero, 2008     
 With Wings Like Eagles: A History of the Battle of Britain, Harper, 2009, 
 Hero: The Life and Legend of Lawrence of Arabia, Harper, 2010,   
 Clouds of Glory: The Life and Legend of Robert E. Lee, Harper, 2014, 
 Alone: Britain, Churchill, and Dunkirk: Defeat into Victory, Liveright, 2017, 
 Passing: A Memoir of Love and Death, Liveright, 2019,

Notable books as editor or publisher
 The Forest People by Colin Turnbull
 The Love Machine (1969) by Jacqueline Susann
 The Story of Civilization VII: The Age of Reason Begins by Will Durant and Ariel Durant
 The Fifth Horseman by Larry Collins and Dominique LaPierre

References

External links

 YouTube - "Meet the Author: Michael Korda" - On Thursday, 2 December 2010, author Michael Korda was the featured speaker at Darien Library to talk about his new book, "Hero: The Life and Legend of Lawrence of Arabia."
 
In Depth interview with Korda, 2 November 2014

1933 births
20th-century English novelists
English editors
Living people
Alumni of Institut Le Rosey
English people of Hungarian-Jewish descent
English male novelists
American literary editors
20th-century English male writers
Writers from London
Royal Air Force personnel